Hunting Hill is a summit in Alberta, Canada. The width at its base is 0.22 meters.

Hunting Hill's English name comes from the Cree Indians of the area, who used the hill as a lookout point in order to hunt buffalo.

References

Hills of Alberta